Acacia auricoma, commonly known as Petermann wattle, Alumaru and Nyalpilintji wattle is a shrub of the genus Acacia and the subgenus Plurinerves. It is native to an area in the Northern Territory and the eastern Goldfields region of Western Australia.

Description
Like most species of Acacia it has phyllodes rather than true leaves.

Taxonomy
The species was first formally described by the botanist Bruce Maslin in 1980 as part of the work Acacia (Leguminosae-Mimosoideae): A contribution to the flora of central Australia as published in the Journal of the Adelaide Botanic Gardens. It was reclassified as Racosperma auricomum in 2003 by Leslie Pedley then transferred back to genus Acacia in 2006.

Distribution
It is endemic to a small area of arid central Australia extending from around Anne Range and Bloods Range in the west to the Petermann Range in the east where it is commonly situated on quartzite scree slopes growing in skeletal soils as a part of open shrubland communities dominated by spinifex.

See also
 List of Acacia species

References

auricoma
Flora of the Northern Territory
Acacias of Western Australia
Plants described in 1980
Taxa named by Bruce Maslin